The 1971–72 New York Rangers season was the franchise's 46th season. Jean Ratelle, Vic Hadfield, and Rod Gilbert ranked third, fourth and fifth overall in league scoring. The Rangers qualified for the postseason for the sixth consecutive season. The club made its first appearance in the Stanley Cup final since 1950 but lost in six games to the Boston Bruins.

Regular season

Final standings

Schedule and results

|- align="center" bgcolor="white"
| 1 || 9 || @ Montreal Canadiens || 4–4 || 0–0–1
|- align="center" bgcolor="#CCFFCC"
| 2 || 10 || @ Boston Bruins || 4–1 || 1–0–1
|- align="center" bgcolor="#FFBBBB"
| 3 || 13 || Boston Bruins || 6–1 || 1–1–1
|- align="center" bgcolor="#CCFFCC"
| 4 || 16 || @ Toronto Maple Leafs || 5–3 || 2–1–1
|- align="center" bgcolor="#CCFFCC"
| 5 || 17 || Montreal Canadiens || 8–4 || 3–1–1
|- align="center" bgcolor="#CCFFCC"
| 6 || 20 || Chicago Black Hawks || 3–1 || 4–1–1
|- align="center" bgcolor="#CCFFCC"
| 7 || 23 || @ St. Louis Blues || 4–3 || 5–1–1
|- align="center" bgcolor="white"
| 8 || 24 || Pittsburgh Penguins || 1–1 || 5–1–2
|- align="center" bgcolor="#CCFFCC"
| 9 || 27 || Detroit Red Wings || 7–4 || 6–1–2
|- align="center" bgcolor="white"
| 10 || 30 || @ Pittsburgh Penguins || 1–1 || 6–1–3
|- align="center" bgcolor="white"
| 11 || 31 || Toronto Maple Leafs || 3–3 || 6–1–4
|-

|- align="center" bgcolor="#CCFFCC"
| 12 || 3 || @ Los Angeles Kings || 7–1 || 7–1–4
|- align="center" bgcolor="#CCFFCC"
| 13 || 5 || @ California Golden Seals || 8–1 || 8–1–4
|- align="center" bgcolor="#CCFFCC"
| 14 || 6 || @ Vancouver Canucks || 3–1 || 9–1–4
|- align="center" bgcolor="#CCFFCC"
| 15 || 10 || Los Angeles Kings || 7–1 || 10–1–4
|- align="center" bgcolor="#CCFFCC"
| 16 || 13 || Buffalo Sabres || 5–2 || 11–1–4
|- align="center" bgcolor="#CCFFCC"
| 17 || 14 || Vancouver Canucks || 6–1 || 12–1–4
|- align="center" bgcolor="#FFBBBB"
| 18 || 20 || @ Minnesota North Stars || 4–1 || 12–2–4
|- align="center" bgcolor="#CCFFCC"
| 19 || 21 || California Golden Seals || 12–1 || 13–2–4
|- align="center" bgcolor="#CCFFCC"
| 20 || 24 || St. Louis Blues || 8–3 || 14–2–4
|- align="center" bgcolor="#FFBBBB"
| 21 || 27 || @ Detroit Red Wings || 3–1 || 14–3–4
|- align="center" bgcolor="#CCFFCC"
| 22 || 28 || @ Philadelphia Flyers || 4–2 || 15–3–4
|-

|- align="center" bgcolor="#CCFFCC"
| 23 || 1 || Buffalo Sabres || 7–2 || 16–3–4
|- align="center" bgcolor="#FFBBBB"
| 24 || 4 || @ Pittsburgh Penguins || 4–2 || 16–4–4
|- align="center" bgcolor="#CCFFCC"
| 25 || 5 || Vancouver Canucks || 6–3 || 17–4–4
|- align="center" bgcolor="white"
| 26 || 8 || @ Chicago Black Hawks || 2–2 || 17–4–5
|- align="center" bgcolor="#CCFFCC"
| 27 || 9 || @ Philadelphia Flyers || 5–0 || 18–4–5
|- align="center" bgcolor="#CCFFCC"
| 28 || 12 || Pittsburgh Penguins || 6–1 || 19–4–5
|- align="center" bgcolor="#CCFFCC"
| 29 || 15 || Philadelphia Flyers || 6–2 || 20–4–5
|- align="center" bgcolor="#FFBBBB"
| 30 || 16 || @ Boston Bruins || 8–1 || 20–5–5
|- align="center" bgcolor="#CCFFCC"
| 31 || 18 || @ St. Louis Blues || 5–2 || 21–5–5
|- align="center" bgcolor="white"
| 32 || 19 || Minnesota North Stars || 1–1 || 21–5–6
|- align="center" bgcolor="#CCFFCC"
| 33 || 22 || Pittsburgh Penguins || 4–2 || 22–5–6
|- align="center" bgcolor="#CCFFCC"
| 34 || 25 || @ Minnesota North Stars || 2–1 || 23–5–6
|- align="center" bgcolor="#CCFFCC"
| 35 || 26 || Montreal Canadiens || 5–1 || 24–5–6
|- align="center" bgcolor="#CCFFCC"
| 36 || 29 || Philadelphia Flyers || 5–1 || 25–5–6
|-

|- align="center" bgcolor="#FFBBBB"
| 37 || 2 || Boston Bruins || 4–1 || 25–6–6
|- align="center" bgcolor="#CCFFCC"
| 38 || 5 || St. Louis Blues || 9–1 || 26–6–6
|- align="center" bgcolor="#CCFFCC"
| 39 || 9 || Los Angeles Kings || 8–0 || 27–6–6
|- align="center" bgcolor="white"
| 40 || 12 || @ Chicago Black Hawks || 5–5 || 27–6–7
|- align="center" bgcolor="#CCFFCC"
| 41 || 13 || @ Buffalo Sabres || 5–2 || 28–6–7
|- align="center" bgcolor="#FFBBBB"
| 42 || 15 || @ Toronto Maple Leafs || 4–3 || 28–7–7
|- align="center" bgcolor="#CCFFCC"
| 43 || 19 || @ Los Angeles Kings || 5–1 || 29–7–7
|- align="center" bgcolor="#CCFFCC"
| 44 || 21 || @ California Golden Seals || 5–0 || 30–7–7
|- align="center" bgcolor="#FFBBBB"
| 45 || 22 || @ Vancouver Canucks || 5–2 || 30–8–7
|- align="center" bgcolor="#CCFFCC"
| 46 || 26 || Buffalo Sabres || 5–1 || 31–8–7
|- align="center" bgcolor="#FFBBBB"
| 47 || 29 || @ Minnesota North Stars || 4–2 || 31–9–7
|- align="center" bgcolor="white"
| 48 || 30 || Minnesota North Stars || 1–1 || 31–9–8
|-

|- align="center" bgcolor="#FFBBBB"
| 49 || 2 || Boston Bruins || 2–0 || 31–10–8
|- align="center" bgcolor="#CCFFCC"
| 50 || 3 || @ Buffalo Sabres || 4–2 || 32–10–8
|- align="center" bgcolor="#FFBBBB"
| 51 || 5 || @ St. Louis Blues || 6–5 || 32–11–8
|- align="center" bgcolor="white"
| 52 || 6 || Toronto Maple Leafs || 2–2 || 32–11–9
|- align="center" bgcolor="#CCFFCC"
| 53 || 9 || Chicago Black Hawks || 4–1 || 33–11–9
|- align="center" bgcolor="#CCFFCC"
| 54 || 12 || @ Pittsburgh Penguins || 8–3 || 34–11–9
|- align="center" bgcolor="#CCFFCC"
| 55 || 13 || Los Angeles Kings || 4–2 || 35–11–9
|- align="center" bgcolor="#CCFFCC"
| 56 || 15 || @ Vancouver Canucks || 5–1 || 36–11–9
|- align="center" bgcolor="#CCFFCC"
| 57 || 17 || @ Los Angeles Kings || 6–4 || 37–11–9
|- align="center" bgcolor="white"
| 58 || 18 || @ California Golden Seals || 2–2 || 37–11–10
|- align="center" bgcolor="#CCFFCC"
| 59 || 20 || Detroit Red Wings || 4–3 || 38–11–10
|- align="center" bgcolor="#CCFFCC"
| 60 || 22 || @ Montreal Canadiens || 7–3 || 39–11–10
|- align="center" bgcolor="#CCFFCC"
| 61 || 23 || Philadelphia Flyers || 4–3 || 40–11–10
|- align="center" bgcolor="#CCFFCC"
| 62 || 27 || St. Louis Blues || 2–0 || 41–11–10
|-

|- align="center" bgcolor="#CCFFCC"
| 63 || 1 || California Golden Seals || 4–1 || 42–11–10
|- align="center" bgcolor="#CCFFCC"
| 64 || 2 || @ Buffalo Sabres || 4–3 || 43–11–10
|- align="center" bgcolor="#CCFFCC"
| 65 || 5 || Vancouver Canucks || 6–1 || 44–11–10
|- align="center" bgcolor="white"
| 66 || 8 || Chicago Black Hawks || 3–3 || 44–11–11
|- align="center" bgcolor="#CCFFCC"
| 67 || 11 || @ Detroit Red Wings || 4–2 || 45–11–11
|- align="center" bgcolor="#FFBBBB"
| 68 || 12 || California Golden Seals || 7–3 || 45–12–11
|- align="center" bgcolor="#FFBBBB"
| 69 || 15 || @ Chicago Black Hawks || 3–1 || 45–13–11
|- align="center" bgcolor="#CCFFCC"
| 70 || 16 || @ Detroit Red Wings || 2–1 || 46–13–11
|- align="center" bgcolor="#CCFFCC"
| 71 || 18 || @ Philadelphia Flyers || 5–3 || 47–13–11
|- align="center" bgcolor="#CCFFCC"
| 72 || 19 || Toronto Maple Leafs || 5–3 || 48–13–11
|- align="center" bgcolor="#FFBBBB"
| 73 || 23 || @ Boston Bruins || 4–1 || 48–14–11
|- align="center" bgcolor="white"
| 74 || 25 || @ Montreal Canadiens || 3–3 || 48–14–12
|- align="center" bgcolor="#FFBBBB"
| 75 || 26 || Minnesota North Stars || 5–0 || 48–15–12
|- align="center" bgcolor="white"
| 76 || 29 || Detroit Red Wings || 2–2 || 48–15–13
|-

|- align="center" bgcolor="#FFBBBB"
| 77 || 1 || @ Toronto Maple Leafs || 2–1 || 48–16–13
|- align="center" bgcolor="#FFBBBB"
| 78 || 2 || Montreal Canadiens || 6–5 || 48–17–13
|-

Playoffs

Key:  Win  Loss

Player statistics
Skaters

Goaltenders

†Denotes player spent time with another team before joining Rangers. Stats reflect time with Rangers only.
‡Traded mid-season. Stats reflect time with Rangers only.

Awards and records

Draft picks
New York's picks at the 1971 NHL Amateur Draft in Montreal, Quebec, Canada.

References

External links
 Rangers on Hockey Database

New York Rangers seasons
New York Rangers
New York Rangers
New York Rangers
New York Rangers
1970s in Manhattan
Madison Square Garden